Carlo Yvon (29 April 1798 in Milan – 23 December 1854 in Milan) was an Italian composer, virtuoso oboist and English horn player, and music educator. He studied at the Milan Conservatory in his native city and later was a teacher at that school. For many years he served as principal oboist at La Scala. Several of his symphonic and chamber works feature the oboe, many of which are still performed today.

Selected works
 Allegro e variazioni for oboe and orchestra
 Canto notturno for soprano and piano
 Capriccio per tre oboi (Capriccio for 3 Oboes) (composed between 1835 and 1850)
 2 Duetti for 2 oboes
 G major
 E major
 Sonata in F minor for English horn (or viola, or clarinet) and piano (published 1831)
 6 Studi (6 Etudes) for oboe and piano
 12 Studi (12 Etudes) for oboe

Discography
 Carlo Yvon: Opera integrale per Oboe (Carlo Yvon: Complete Works for Oboe); ; Alessandro Cappella (piano); Tactus Records TC.792401 (2004)
 Music for Oboe, Oboe d'amore, Cor anglais & Piano – Sonata for English horn and piano; Albrecht Mayer (English horn), Markus Becker (piano); Angel Records (1999)
 Thomas Stacy: Principal English Horn – Sonata for English horn and piano; Thomas Stacy (English horn), Paul Schwartz (piano); Cala Records CACD0511 (2006)

References

External links
 
 Carlo Yvon: biography at Tactus Records
 Carlo Yvon: biography

1798 births
1854 deaths
Italian composers
Italian male composers
Italian classical oboists
Male oboists
Milan Conservatory alumni
Academic staff of Milan Conservatory
Musicians from Milan
Cor anglais players
19th-century Italian musicians
19th-century English musicians
19th-century Italian male musicians